Žebrák is a town in Beroun District in the Central Bohemian Region of the Czech Republic. It has about 2,100 inhabitants.

Administrative parts
The village od Sedlec is an administrative part of Žebrák.

Geography
It lies mostly in the Hořovice Uplands, the northern part of the municipal territory extends into the Křivoklát Highlands and into the Křivoklátsko Protected Landscape Area. The Stroupínský Stream flows through the town. It supplies two ponds in the area, Žebrácký and Radost.

History
The first written mention of Žebrák is from 1280. It became a busy marketplace on the trade route from Prague to Plzeň and Bavaria. In 1396, it was promoted to a town by King Wenceslaus IV. The greatest development occurred in the 16th century.

Transport
The D5 motorway from Prague to Plzeň passes through the municipal territory.

Sights

The landmark of the town centre is the Church of Saint Lawrence. It was built in the late Baroque style in 1780–1788, when it replaced an old church from the 14th century.

The second church if the Baroque cemetery church of Saint Roch. It dates from the 18th century.

Žebrák shares its name with the nearby Žebrák Castle, however, this castle is located in the territory of the neighbouring Točník.

Notable people
Vojtěch Nejedlý (1772–1844), writer
Oldřich Nejedlý (1909–1990), footballer

Trivia

References

External links

Cities and towns in the Czech Republic
Populated places in the Beroun District